The Love Hurts Tour was the third solo concert tour by American singer-actress Cher. The tour supported her twentieth studio album, Love Hurts. The tour reached Europe and North America.  It played in arenas and followed the previous Heart of Stone Tour.

Background
Encouraged by the reception of the album Love Hurts, the European smash single "The Shoop Shoop Song", and after the performance of "Could've Been You" at Top of the Pops – considered as a tour preview,  Cher performed six shows as a tour preview at the Sands Atlantic City in Atlantic City, New Jersey. After the promotion of the album on various American TV shows (like Late Night with David Letterman, Dame Edna Show, In Concert and others...). Although Cher toured Europe extensively, she performed a limited tour in the United States. The tour was originally set to commence in March 1992, however, this was postponed until April 1992 due to illness. During an interview, Cher apologized to spectators stating, "I am very disappointed that we had to postpone these shows and I apologize to all my fans who bought tickets."

In comparison with her previous tour, the show was less elaborate, but more controversial for the clothes and the religious symbols used. At the center of the stage there was a big dry tree with branches that extended to the two sides of the stage. There were also brick-like columns and on top of each there was a religious symbol: a serpent pierced, a stylized fish that the first Christians drew in the catacombs, a cross, the symbol of peace, and the heart of the Ex-voto (which was also used for the first controversial cover of the album Heart of Stone). Above, hanging on the right, there was a black angel, naked, with big golden wings. Since the tour was rock centric, many of her popular songs were not performed. Several covers performed including: "Many Rivers To Cross", "Fire", "Love is a Battlefield" and her recent number one hit in the UK "The Shoop Shoop Song", from the film Mermaids.

Costumes
Fashion designer Bob Mackie created nine unique ensembles for the Love Hurts Tour, repeating the same Leather/Dominatrix style of the Geffen-era. On this, Cher used some clothes already used in previous tours or for public appearances. 
The first, is for the performance of "We All Sleep Alone" and "I Found Someone" where Cher wore clothes with holes and paillettes and the black curly wig. For the first song she added a black leather jacket. This dress was previously used in "The Black Rose Show" and in the "I Found Someone" music video.  During the performance of "After All" Cher wore an Ice Queen fur coat with sequined designs and pointed hat. This was used in the Heart of Stone Tour.  The last one was similar to the dress she wore when she attended the Academy Awards and won her award for Best Actress in 1988. This was used for the performance of "Many Rivers to Cross" and was a dark, sparkly, and transparent dress.

All the other dresses were used only for this tour. For the first part of the show, Cher wore a suit. The jacket was always open to show a top in lace with long and transparent sleeves. Cher also had a red curly wig and wore many pearl necklaces.  After the second change, Cher wore a lace baby-doll dress, with the black smooth wig or the black curly wig and performed "Love and Understanding" and "Save Up All Your Tears".  During the country portion of the show, she wore a bondage corset, black boots, and black trousers. She also used the black curly wig, and sometimes a straw hat. For "Love Is a Battlefield" she wore a dress with a Roman Soldiers look and she used a long black wig. After that Cher performed her hit song "If I Could Turn Back Time" and wore a leather bondage outfit with a curly black wig. Finally, for the encore, Cher wore the same white baby-doll dress with wavy wig.
During the European and North American shows the costumes remained the same, except for the night of Halloween in New York, where Cher for the first songs wore a witch dress with a twisted bodice and a black transparent skirt. For the performance she also wore a white and black wig. The same wig was also used for the "If I Could Turn Back Time" performance.

Source:

Concert synopsis
In the beginning of the show, a screen projected her life: from her family, to her television, music and film career. After that, the screen went up, and she descended from a platform and began to sing "I Still Haven't Found What I'm Looking For". From here she moves into "Bye Bye Baby", "We All Sleep Alone", "I Found Someone", "Love and Understanding" and "Save up All Your Tears".

When the song ended, the screen came down and showed some scenes of her most famous films. Then she once again descended from the platform and did "After All". After a fast change she performed "Many Rivers To Cross".

After an instrumental song, began the country part of the show. She sang "Fire" and "Just like Jesse James". Then she did "Love Is a Battlefield" and "If I Could Turn Back Time". After those songs she had the first encore and performed "Love Hurts" and "The Shoop Shoop Song (It's in His Kiss)" and ended with the second encore performing "The Fire Down Below". 
The second encore was only done on a few dates. Generally, the setlist didn't change during the tour, but sometimes Cher replaced some of the songs with covers, or her old songs.

In Sands Hotel & Casino in Atlantic City – New Jersey, shows the customs had changes were less skimpy clothes than was being used on tour. The opening songs Cher used a basic model, “Love and Understanding” had changed wig, “The Shoop Shoop Song” was dates in which she used the smooth wig (like the cover of the album “Love Hurts”) and the wig Video Clip “Save Up All Your Tears”. She used clothes 80's show in Las Vegas (Caesar's Palace show from 1981 to 1982) to new song.

Set list
REHEARSAL
{{hidden 
| titlestyle = background: #ccccff; font-size: 100%; width: 65%; text-align:center;
| bodystyle = text-align: left; font-size: 100%; width: 75%;
| title  = Rehearsal - US 1991
| content =
Set list just for one special night with a few guests before the opening concert.
"I Still Haven't Found What I'm Looking For"
"I'm No Angel"
"Bye Bye Baby"
"Tougher Than the Rest"
"One Night"
"I Can't Make You Love Me"
"Hold On"
"Alberta"
"We All Sleep Alone"
 Encore
"Love Hurts"
"The Fire Down Below"
}}

SET LIST

"I Still Haven't Found What I'm Looking For"
"Love on a Rooftop"
"Bye Bye Baby"
"We All Sleep Alone"
"I Found Someone"
"Love and Understanding"
"Save Up All Your Tears"
"After All" (performed with Paul Mirkovich)
"Many Rivers to Cross"
"Fire"
"Just Like Jesse James"
"One Night"
"Love Is a Battlefield"
"If I Could Turn Back Time"

 Encore
"Love Hurts"
"The Shoop Shoop Song (It's in His Kiss)"
"The Fire Down Below"

Shows

Box office score data

Cancelled shows

Personnel
Production
Tour Manager: Bill Sammeth / Charlie Stuart Gay
Producer: Richard Wechsler 
Executive Producer: David Kelly
Stage Designer: Jeremy Railton
Lighting Design: Live Light INC.
Cher's Personal Trainer: Angela Best
Costumes Designer: Bob Mackie and Maggie Barry
Musical Direction & Choreographer: Doriana Sanchez

Band
Guitar: Dave Amato
Drums: Ron Wikso
Keyboards: Paul Mirkovich and Dave Vanacore and Scott Gorham
Keyboard Technician in Atlantic City: Peter Wiltz 
Background vocals: Patty Darcy Jones
Supporting Vocals: Dava Amata and Paul Mirkovich
Dancer: Bubba Carr, Aaron Cash, Michelle Rudy Mirkovich, and Trish Ramish

Notes

References

Cher concert tours
1992 concert tours